The Temple of Victory (Greek Nikē) is a Greek temple of the ancient city of Himera located in the archaeological area of Termini Imerese, in the Metropolitan City of Palermo in Sicily, southern Italy.

Description 
The temple dates to between 480 and 470 BC and has been identified with the temple built at the order of the tyrant Gelon of Syracuse who commanded the Greek coalition which defeated a Carthaginian invasion force at the Battle of Himera in 480 BC.

Probably dedicated to Athena, the building was burnt and destroyed, most likely in 409 BC when the Carthaginians captured the city of Himera.

See also
 List of Ancient Greek temples

References

Sources 
Stefano Vassallo. Himera città greca. Guida alla storia e ai monumenti. Dipartimento dei Beni Culturali, Ambientali e dell'Educazione Permanente, Palermo: 2005.

Victory
Himera
Temples of Athena
Archaeological sites in Sicily
5th-century BC religious buildings and structures
Destroyed temples